Parul Sehgal is an American literary critic who publishes primarily in American venues. She is a former senior editor and columnist at The New York Times Book Review, and was one of the team of book critics at The New York Times.  As of December 2021, she was a staff writer at The New Yorker, a position she was first reported to have taken in July 2021. She teaches in the graduate creative writing program at New York University.

Early life and education
Sehgal was born outside Washington, D.C., and was raised in India, Hungary, the Philippines and Northern Virginia. She studied political science at McGill University in Montreal. After graduating, she traveled to Delhi to work at an NGO. After returning to the US, she earned an MFA from Columbia University.

Career
Seghal was an editor at Publishers Weekly. In 2012, she became an editor at The New York Times Book Review. Sehgal was a New York Times book critic from 2017 to 2021. In 2021, she became a staff writer at The New Yorker.

Awards and recognition
Sehgal received the 2010 National Book Critics Circle's Nona Balakian Citation for Excellence in Reviewing. She won the 2008 Pan African Literary Forum’s OneWorld Prize, and was recognized for her criticism by the New York Press Club. In 2023, she won the Silvers Prize for Literary Criticism. The judges wrote, “She exemplifies the virtues of subtlety, surprise, and above all, pleasure...from the smallest of units—the word, the phrase—to the largest: character, perspective, revelation.”

Personal life
In November 2017, Sehgal described herself as married with a child.

References

External links

Parul Sehgal: An ode to envy, TED talk.

American literary critics
Living people
Year of birth missing (living people)
American women writers of Indian descent
McGill University alumni
Columbia University School of the Arts alumni
American women non-fiction writers
The New York Times people
The New Yorker staff writers
21st-century American women